Pontyberem railway station was opened in 1909 to timetabled passenger services however services for miners began in 1898. It continued to serve the inhabitants of the Pontyberem area and hinterland between 1909 and 1953; it was one of several basic stations opened on the Burry Port and Gwendraeth Valley Railway in Carmarthenshire, Wales.

History

Pontyberem station was opened on 1 February 1909 by the Burry Port and Gwendraeth Valley Railway on the Kidwelly and Cwmmawr section of the line and was closed by the Great Western Railway on Saturday 19 September 1953. It was on the Burry Port and Gwendraeth Valley Railway 

The railway was originally a freight only line apart from passenger trains for miners, but stations were established due to pressure from the public. The freight service continued for coal traffic until 1996 by which time the last of the local collieries had closed down.

Infrastructure
The station stood some way to the east of the village centre and had a single platform, a waiting room and ticket office built with corrugated iron and a passing loop with the through line for freight traffic. In 1915 the signal box stood at the eastern end of the platform and the station stood on the southern side of the line. Two water tanks were present in the station area. A goods shed stood to the west of the level crossing and a line ran off to a spoil heap to the north-west. To the east lay the extensive rail network of the Pont-y-Berem Slants Colliery.

By 1964 Pont-y-Berem Slants Colliery had closed, as had the station. The line was partly built on the old Kidwelly and Llanelly Canal, however incline planes were located at several sites such as Ponthenri.

Remnants
The section south of Pinged, between Burry Port and Craiglon Bridge Halt is now a footpath and cycleway, however other sections of the line have formal and informal footpaths on the old trackbed. At Pontyberem the station area has been built on and the trackbed is partly footpathed.

Routes

See also 
 West Wales lines

References

External links
Burry Port and Gwendreath Railway - 2011

Disused railway stations in Carmarthenshire
Railway stations in Great Britain opened in 1909
Railway stations in Great Britain closed in 1953
Former Great Western Railway stations